Zhao Xiankun (born 27 September 1993) is a Chinese sport shooter.

He participated at the 2018 ISSF World Shooting Championships, winning a medal.

References

External links

Living people
1993 births
Chinese male sport shooters
ISSF pistol shooters
21st-century Chinese people